Augerans is a commune in the Jura department in the region of Bourgogne-Franche-Comté in eastern France.

It is located on the main D7 road, 12 km southeast of Dole, and 50 km southwest of Besançon.

Population

See also
Communes of the Jura department

References

Communes of Jura (department)